Keko is an administrative ward in the Temeke district of the Dar es Salaam Region of Tanzania. According to the 2002 census, the ward has a total population of 32,249.

Keko also hosts the Vocational Education and Training Authority

References

Temeke District
Wards of Dar es Salaam Region